Tony Young (born 1961), professionally known as Master T, is a Canadian television and radio personality and urban music promoter. He was born in Leeds, England, and moved to Canada with his Jamaican family in 1974.

Early life and education 
He was raised in Kitchener, Ontario, where he attended Kitchener-Waterloo Collegiate and Vocational School and met his future wife. He later studied television broadcasting at Mohawk College in Hamilton.

Career at MuchMusic 
He found work as a camera operator at MuchMusic before he was hired to host a dance show, X-Tendamix (later "Da Mix"). As a VJ for MuchMusic, Young (as "Master T") continued to host various programs, including Rap City, from 1990 to 2001. When he left MuchMusic, his on-air farewell party featured an exclusive live performance by Lauryn Hill.

During his time with Much, Master T was the primary promoter of the channel's Much DanceMix series of compilation CDs, and received a Diamond plaque for over one million in sales.

Post-MuchMusic career 
Since leaving MuchMusic, he has produced and promoted his own Master T's series of hip hop and reggae compilations.

In 2014, he publicly called for the "Much" television channel to return to the hands of Moses Znaimer.
Young has also hosted the syndicated radio program Wall of Sound, produced by CIDC-FM.

As of 2017, Young has been hosting the online interview and performance series RX Music LIVE, featuring past guests such as Wyclef Jean, Kardinal Offishall, Vance Joy and more.

Awards 
Young has been awarded a Toronto Bob Marley award, a Ghanaian Community Award, and a Mohawk College Alumni of Distinction award.

Bibliography
  Foreword by Shaggy.

References

External links

Living people
1961 births
Canadian people of Jamaican descent
Canadian radio hosts
English emigrants to Canada
Black Canadian broadcasters
Much (TV channel) personalities
People from Kitchener, Ontario
Canadian VJs (media personalities)